The videography of Japanese pop group AAA includes 71 music videos and 32 video albums.

Music videos

Video albums

Concert tour videos

Other video albums

Notes

References

Videographies of Japanese artists